Benjamin Frederick Lunn (11 June 1905 – 25 April 1985) was an Australian rules footballer who played for the Richmond Football Club and Hawthorn Football Club in the Victorian Football League (VFL).

Lunn was captain-coach of the Rosedale Football Club in the Gippsland Football League in 1927 and won the GFL best and fairest, Jensen Award.

Notes

External links 
		

 Bennie Lunn Profile at Tigerland Archive

1905 births
1985 deaths
Australian rules footballers from Melbourne
Richmond Football Club players
Hawthorn Football Club players
People from Richmond, Victoria